Ante "Biće" Mladinić (1 October 1929 – 13 June 2002) was a Croatian football manager.

He had a modest playing career for Hajduk Split, for whom he scored 43 goals in 146 matches, and Lokomotiva Zagreb.

Managerial career
Later, as coach, he had spells at NK Zagreb, Hajduk, FK Partizan and the Yugoslavia national football team in the mid-1970s. He ended his career as a staff member for Bordeaux, where he discovered players such as Bixente Lizarazu.

He died in Zagreb in 2002 following a long battle with throat cancer.

References

External links
 

1929 births
2002 deaths
Footballers from Split, Croatia
Association football defenders
Yugoslav footballers
HNK Hajduk Split players
NK Lokomotiva Zagreb players
RNK Split players
Yugoslav football managers
HNK Hajduk Split managers
FK Partizan managers
Yugoslavia national football team managers
UEFA Euro 1976 managers
FC Girondins de Bordeaux non-playing staff
Deaths from throat cancer